A transverse ligament is a ligament on a transverse plane, orthogonal to the anteroposterior or oral-aboral axiscan of the body.

In human anatomy, examples are:

 Flexor retinaculum of the hand or transverse carpal ligament (ligamentum carpi transversum)
 Inferior transverse ligament of scapula (ligamentum transversum scapulae inferius)
 Inferior transverse ligament of the tibiofibular syndesmosis
 Superior transverse ligament of the scapula (ligamentum transversum scapulae superius)
 Superior extensor retinaculum of foot or transverse crural ligament (ligamentum transversum cruris)
 Transverse acetabular ligament (ligamentum transversum acetabuli)
 Transverse humeral ligament (ligamentum transversum humeri) 
 Transverse ligament of the atlas (ligamentum transversum atlantis)
 Transverse ligament of knee (ligamentum transversum genus)